Mesorhagini is a tribe of flies in the family Dolichopodidae.

Genera
Amesorhaga Bickel, 1994
Mesorhaga Schiner, 1868
Negrobovia Bickel, 1994

References 

Sciapodinae
Diptera tribes